Leopoldo is a given name, the Italian, Spanish, and Portuguese form of the English, German, Dutch, Polish, and Slovene name, Leopold. 

Notable people with the name include:

Leopoldo de' Medici (1617–1675), Italian cardinal and Governor of Siena
Leopoldo Andara (born 1986), Venezuelan swimmer
Leopoldo Baracco (1886–1966), Italian politician
Leopoldo Batres (1852–1926), Mexican archaeologist
Leopoldo Bersani (1848–1903), Italian painter
Leopoldo Borda Roldan (1898–1977), Colombian engineer
Leopoldo Brenes, Nicaraguan Roman Catholic cardinal
Leopoldo Burlando (1841–1915), Italian painter
Leopoldo Calvo-Sotelo (1926–2008), Spanish politician
Leopoldo Conti (1901–1970), Italian footballer
Leopoldo Diokno, Filipino militant
Leopoldo Elia (1925–2008), Italian politician
Leopoldo Felíz Severa, Puerto Rican politician
Leopoldo Fernández (Tres Patines) (1904–1985), Cuban comedian
Leopoldo Figueroa (1887–1969), Puerto Rican politician
Leopoldo Franchetti (1847–1917), Italian publicist
Leopoldo da Gaiche, Italian Catholic priest
Leopoldo Galtieri (1926–2003) Argentine general and dictator from 1981 to 1982
Leopoldo González González, Mexican archbishop
Leopoldo Jaucian, Filipino Catholic bishop
Leopoldo López Escobar (1940–2013), Chilean geochemist
Leopoldo López Mendoza (born 1971), Venezuelan politician and economist
Leopoldo Luque (born 1949), Argentine footballer
Leopoldo Maggi, Italian physician
Leopoldo María Panero, Spanish poet
Leopoldo Mastelloni (born 1945), Italian actor
Leopoldo Méndez, Mexican graphic artist
Leopoldo Menéndez, Spanish military officer
Leopoldo Mugnone, Italian conductor
Leopoldo Ortiz Climent, Spanish engineer
Leopoldo Ramos Giménez(1891–1988), Paraguayan intellectual
Leopoldo Rubinacci (1903–1969) Italian politician and lawyer 
Leopoldo Ruiz, Argentina golfer
Leopoldo Prato (1845-1896), Italian major
Leopoldo Sánchez Celis (1916–1989), Mexican politician
Leopoldo Sucre Figarella (1926–1996), Venezuelan politician and engineer
Leopoldo Toniolo (1833–1908), Italian painter
Leopoldo Zunini, Italian diplomat

References

Italian masculine given names
Spanish masculine given names
Portuguese masculine given names